Terral (styled as TEЯRAL) is the third studio album by Spanish singer-songwriter Pablo Alborán. It was released on 11 November 2014 through Warner Music. The album was written by Alborán and composed and produced by Eric Rosse. Terral earned a nomination for Best Contemporary Pop Vocal Album at the 16th Latin Grammy Awards and for Best Latin Pop Album at the 58th Annual Grammy Awards.

Singles 
 "Por Fin" was released as the album's lead single on September 16, 2014. The song debuted at number 1 on the Spanish Singles Chart. It has so far spent two consecutive weeks at number one.
 "Pasos de cero" was the second single released as a pre-order single on October 7, 2014. On January 21, 2015 the song was officially released as the second single, with the music video for the song premiering the same day.
 "Recuérdame" was released on May 31, 2015 as the third official single, along with the music video for the song.
 "La Escalera" was released on October 28, 2015 as the fourth and final single, along with the music video.

Track listing 

Terral – French edition

Charts

Weekly charts

Year-end charts

Certifications

Release history

References 

2014 albums
Pablo Alborán albums